Cole Wick (born November 30, 1993) is an American football tight end who is a free agent. He played college football at the University of the Incarnate Word.

Early years
Wick is from Hallettsville, Texas. He played high school football at Sacred Heart Catholic High.

College career

Statistics

Professional career

Detroit Lions
Wick went undrafted in the 2016 NFL Draft. He had free agent offers from the Carolina Panthers and Oakland Raiders before signing with the Detroit Lions. Along with Myke Tavarres, who signed with the Philadelphia Eagles, Wick was the first Incarnate Word football player to make an NFL roster. On September 11, in the season opener against the Indianapolis Colts, Wick recorded his first career reception for five yards in his NFL debut. His rookie season came to an early end after suffering a knee injury. He was placed on injured reserve on November 1, 2016.

On September 2, 2017, Wick was waived by the Lions and was signed to the practice squad the next day. He was released by the team on September 6, 2017.

San Francisco 49ers
On October 18, 2017, Wick was signed to the San Francisco 49ers' practice squad. He signed a reserve/future contract with the 49ers on January 2, 2018.

On October 16, 2018, Wick was waived by the 49ers and was re-signed to the practice squad.

Tennessee Titans
On December 11, 2018, Wick was signed by the Tennessee Titans off the 49ers practice squad after the injury of Jonnu Smith. He was placed on injured reserve on December 24, 2018.

On August 28, 2019, Wick was waived by the Titans.

In October 2019, Wick was selected by the Tampa Bay Vipers in the 2020 XFL Draft.

Oakland Raiders
On December 4, 2019, Wick was signed to the Oakland Raiders practice squad. He was released on December 11.

New Orleans Saints
On December 27, 2019, Wick was signed to the New Orleans Saints practice squad. He signed a reserve/future contract with the Saints on January 7, 2020. On July 28, 2020, Wick announced he was opting out of the 2020 season due to the COVID-19 pandemic. He was waived after the season on February 12, 2021.

References

1993 births
Living people
People from Hallettsville, Texas
Players of American football from Texas
American football tight ends
Incarnate Word Cardinals football players
Detroit Lions players
San Francisco 49ers players
Tennessee Titans players
Oakland Raiders players
New Orleans Saints players